The Xikou Suspension Bridge is a suspension bridge in Fuxing District, Taoyuan City, Taiwan. It crosses the Dahan River.

History
The bridge was inaugurated in January 2018 to replace the old bridge constructed at the same site.

Technical specifications
The bridge spans over a length of 330 meters.

See also
 
 
 
 List of bridges in Taiwan

References

2018 establishments in Taiwan
Bridges completed in 2018
Suspension bridges in Taoyuan City